Vengeance Unlimited is an American crime drama series broadcast during 1998–1999 on ABC which lasted for one season of sixteen episodes. The show starred Michael Madsen and Kathleen York.

Premise 
Mr. Chapel was a mysterious stranger keen on serving justice to those who had been ignored by the law. To achieve those ends, Mr. Chapel made use of promised favors from former clients. People in trouble were usually contacted by Chapel with an envelope on their front doorstep containing newspaper clippings related to previous clients, along with the phone number 555-0132. When Mr. Chapel took a case, his demand was simple: either pay a fee of one million dollars, or promise to do a favor at some time in the future—whatever, whenever, wherever and for however long he needed you—then your debt would be paid in full. In the series pilot, it was clear that Mr. Chapel had been doing this for some time, as he called in a number of favors to help his current client.

A running joke throughout the series was whenever one of those former clients paid their debt to Mr. Chapel's satisfaction, he would say, "We're even. I'm out of your life. Forever." The client would invariably respond, "Thank God!" Some favors are ongoing, such as the one owed from Boone Paladin, owner of The Paladin Motel chain, who grants Chapel permanent guest status in all of his motels. K.C. Griffin (York), a woman who worked in the district attorney's office, was the one former client who stayed after doing her one favor, and continued to assist Chapel with his cases.

Chapel made few promises. Those that he did make, he would fulfill (or die trying). Though he had no compunctions about using lethal force if necessary, Chapel refused entirely to use guns. Current clients were sent away, if at all possible, to keep them out of the line of fire (and provide them plausible deniability). There are hints throughout the series that Chapel began his crusade after suffering a traumatic personal tragedy.

Episodes

Ratings and cancellation
The show was canceled by ABC, after ranking only 109th out of 156 shows, with an average viewership of just 7.1 million viewers. The show ranked 4th in its timeslot, being beaten by NBC's Friends (2nd, 23.5 million) and Jesse (4th, 20.1 million), CBS's Promised Land (51st, 11.5 million), and FOX's World's Wildest Police Videos (77th, 9.6 million). However, the show did beat out UPN's Thursday Night at the Movies (145th, 2.5 million) and The WB's The Wayans Bros. (134th, 3.5 million) and The Jamie Foxx Show (129th, 3.8 million).

External links 
 

1990s American crime drama television series
1998 American television series debuts
1999 American television series endings
American Broadcasting Company original programming
English-language television shows
Television series by Warner Bros. Television Studios
Television series created by John McNamara (writer)
Vigilante television series